ART Innsbruck is an international fair for contemporary art held annually in Innsbruck. The  fair features about 70 exhibitors from 8 to 10 nations presenting fine art of the 20th and 21st centuries. It is organized by the Development Association of Fine Arts and is the second largest art fair in Austria, second only to ART Vienna.

ART Innsbruck was started in 1997 and has taken place since the foundation every year in February. It is held at the fair hall of Innsbruck. Events include "ART-Clubbing", the "ART-Lounge" and art seminars for beginners and collectors.

At the program: fine arts from the 20th and 21st century – 
paintings, original prints, works on paper, editions, sculptures, photography, new media,
Art as an investment and return items from the period after 1960.

For art lovers and collectors 
Paintings, works on paper, original graphics, sculptures, editions, photography, new mediums, multiples, objects and installations –  the ART Innsbruck presents international fine art of the 20th and 21st century.

Maximum seventy exhibitors are allowed. Thereby and through the selected exhibitor jury the ART Innsbruck obtains her small and very fine,
exclusive ambience. The ART Innsbruck is conceived according to international valid criteria for art fairs.  

Under the motto "For art lovers and collectors" are gallery owners, artists, and experts meeting. The fair is a mediator between creators of art, art providers and art friends, as well as galleries and the public. The fair has now become indispensable as a meeting point for local and international art scene.

History 
 1997: First fair under the name "editions of art", start in hall 1 of the fair Innsbruck
 1998: Change of the name to "ART Innsbruck"
 1999: 20 percent increase of visitors
 2002/2003: expansion to Vienna: Foundation of the ART Vienna according to the same concept
 2002/2003: expansion to Vienna: Foundation of the ART Vienna according to the same concept
 2006: Relaunch of the name ART international fair for contemporary art Innsbruck
 2007/2008: Beginning of the side events ART-Clubbing and the year-round ART-Lounge with lifestyle audience
 2012: Chaningin the company name into "ART Kunstmesse"
 2013: Visitors record: more than 17,000 visitors on all fair days
 2015: Expansion of the fair program to contemporary art and antiques of the 19th, 20th and 21st century under the slogan "Art of the centuries for lovers and collectors"

External links

Art festivals in Austria
Festivals in Innsbruck
Winter events in Austria